André Filipe Aguiar Dias (born 18 April 1992 in Torre de Moncorvo, Bragança District) is a Portuguese footballer who plays for Lusitano Ginásio Clube Moncarapachense as a left back.

References

External links

1992 births
Living people
Portuguese footballers
Association football defenders
Primeira Liga players
Liga Portugal 2 players
Campeonato de Portugal (league) players
Rio Ave F.C. players
F.C. Tirsense players
C.F. União players
C.D. Aves players
Vilaverdense F.C. players
S.C. Olhanense players
C.D. Mafra players
F.C. Alverca players
Portugal youth international footballers
Sportspeople from Bragança District